This is the list of the winners of the Sundance Grand Jury Prize for dramatic features.

Winners

1980s
1984: Old Enough
1985: Blood Simple
1986: Smooth Talk
1987: Waiting for the Moon/The Trouble with Dick
1988: Heat and Sunlight
1989: True Love

1990s
1990: Chameleon Street
1991: Poison
1992: In the Soup
1993: Ruby in Paradise/Public Access
1994: What Happened Was...
1995: The Brothers McMullen
1996: Welcome to the Dollhouse
1997: Sunday
1998: Slam
1999: Three Seasons

2000s
2000: Girlfight/You Can Count on Me
2001: The Believer
2002: Personal Velocity
2003: American Splendor
2004: Primer
2005: Forty Shades of Blue
2006: Quinceañera
2007: Padre Nuestro
2008: Frozen River
2009: Precious: Based on the Novel "Push" by Sapphire

2010s
2010: Winter's Bone
2011: Like Crazy
2012: Beasts of the Southern Wild
2013: Fruitvale Station
2014: Whiplash
2015: Me and Earl and the Dying Girl
2016: The Birth of a Nation
2017: I Don't Feel at Home in This World Anymore
2018: The Miseducation of Cameron Post
2019: Clemency

2020s
2020: Minari
2021: CODA
2022: Nanny
2023: A Thousand and One

See also
Palm d'Or
Academy Award for Best Picture

References

Sundance Film Festival
Awards for best film